is the second CD single by Haruko Momoi, and her first solo single after Under17 disbanded. The titular song "Ton Dol Baby" was used as the ending theme to the anime series Akahori Gedou Hour Rabuge.

Track listing

References

2005 songs
Haruko Momoi songs
Song articles with missing songwriters